The 1993 Belgian Grand Prix was a Formula One motor race held at Spa-Francorchamps on 29 August 1993. It was the twelfth round of the 1993 Formula One season. Damon Hill scored a second successive victory. Alain Prost was leading the race and looked set to win, but a miscommunication during his second pitstop cost him time and he dropped behind Hill and Michael Schumacher. Williams's 1–3 finish clinched the Constructors' Championship for the team.

Lotus driver Alessandro Zanardi was withdrawn from the meeting following a huge crash in Friday practice, which ultimately ended his season. In the race itself, his team-mate Johnny Herbert scored the final points ever for Team Lotus with his 5th position. Local driver Thierry Boutsen retired from Formula One following the race (after his race ended on the first lap with a gearbox failure).

Report

Qualifying
In Belgium, the grid was similar to Hungary with Williamses 1–2 in qualifying, Prost taking pole ahead of Hill, Schumacher, Alesi, Senna and Suzuki.

Race
At the start, Senna got ahead of both Schumacher and Alesi with Alesi also getting by Schumacher. The order at the end of lap 1 was: Prost, Senna, Hill, Alesi, Schumacher and Suzuki.

Alesi retired then with suspension troubles on lap 4, releasing Schumacher. Schumacher then set off after Senna and overtook him on the grass during the first round of pitstops. The first stops did not change anything, with Prost leading from Hill, Schumacher and Senna. Suzuki was a distant fifth until his gearbox failed on lap 15. Prost had a slow second stop, which allowed Hill to take the lead. Schumacher then overtook Prost to claim second. Prost smashed the lap record on lap 41 in his chase of Schumacher, but he found out that he was just a tenth quicker and settled for third. Hill won, wrapping up the Constructors Championship for Williams with Schumacher and Prost close behind. Senna was a lonely fourth, while Herbert and Patrese, who spun after his pitstop, took the final points. Herbert's 2 points for 5th place would turn out to be the last points finish for a Team Lotus driver.

Thus, with three-quarters of the season gone, Prost was a full 28 points ahead and could sense the championship, having 81 points to Senna's 53. Hill was third with 48, Schumacher was fourth with 42, Patrese was fifth with 18, Brundle was sixth with 11, Herbert was seventh with 11 and Blundell was eighth with 10. In the Constructors Championship, Williams were World Champions with 129 points ahead of Benetton who were second with 60, McLaren close behind in third with 56 and Ligier fourth with 21 – their best performance in some years.

Classification

Qualifying

Race

Championship standings after the race
 Bold text indicates who still had a theoretical chance of becoming World Champion.

Drivers' Championship standings

Constructors' Championship standings

 Note: Only the top five positions are included for both sets of standings.

References

Belgian Grand Prix
Belgian Grand Prix
Grand Prix
Belgian Grand Prix